Ghulam Farid is a male Muslim given name. It may refer to

Khwaja Ghulam Farid (1845–1901), Indian Sufi poet
Malik Ghulam Farid (1897–1977), Ahmadiyya missionary
Ghulam Farid Sabri (1930–1994), Pakistani Qawwali singer